Frog Bog is a 1982 video game by Mattel Electronics for the Intellivision. An Atari 2600 conversion was released later that year as Frogs and Flies. In both games, each player controls a frog sitting on a lily pad, attempting to eat more flies than the other.  Frog Bog is similar to the 1978 Sega-Gremlin arcade game Frogs.

Gameplay

Each game starts out in the morning with a light blue sky. If there is not a second player, the system will automatically take control of the red frog within a few seconds. Each frog jumps from one lily pad to the other. During each hop, a number of flies fly around the screen. The player pushes the fire button, which causes the frog's tongue to stick out. If the frog is in the right spot ahead or behind a fly, it catches and eats the fly. Each time a fly is captured it is worth two points. The game progresses throughout the day, with the sky turning a darker shade of blue, and eventually turning black as the day ends. About a minute after the sky turns black, the two frogs leave the screen – the green frog exits to the left, and the red frog to the right. A firefly then comes on to the screen carrying a "The End" message, which it leaves in the center of the screen. The frog who has captured the most flies at that point is the winner.

There are two different levels that players can select. On the first level, the jumping off and landing points are fixed, the user needs to time their jumps to catch any flies who may come into the frog's flight path. On the second level, the frogs are free to move about the ground to catch flies as the jumping and landing points are not fixed. A player can even cause a frog to jump into the water – in that case, the frog will swim back on to the nearest pad. Generally this is to be avoided since it takes several seconds for the frog to swim back to the pad.

Reviews
Games

Legacy
In 2020, Intellivision Entertainment announced updated version of the game for the forthcoming Intellivision Amico. As of June 2022, the console was yet to be released.

References

External links
Frog Bog at INTV Funhouse
Frogs and Flies at Atari Mania

1982 video games
Atari 2600 games
Intellivision games
Action video games
North America-exclusive video games
Mattel video games
Video game clones
Video games about amphibians
Video games about insects
Video games developed in the United States
Multiplayer and single-player video games